Raymond George Kubala (October 26, 1942 – August 30, 2018) was an American football player.  He played college football at Texas A&M where he was selected by the American Football Coaches Association (AFCA) as the second-team center on the 1963 College Football All-America Team.  He played professional football for the Denver Broncos from 1964 to 1967.

References

1942 births
2018 deaths
American football centers
Texas A&M Aggies football players
Denver Broncos (AFL) players
All-American college football players
Players of American football from Texas
People from West, Texas
Neurological disease deaths in Texas
Deaths from motor neuron disease